Zippy is a word meaning "energetic and lively; quick, speedy". It may also refer to:

People
Blaine Cook, stage name of Seattle punk singer
Greg Zipadelli (born 1967), nickname for the NASCAR crew chief 
Stuart Langridge, author and programmer nicknamed Zippy
Tzipi Livni, an Israeli politician and former minister of foreign affairs

Fictional characters
Mr. ZIP, informally Zippy, a cartoon character used by the U.S. Postal Service
Zippy (mascot), the name of the mascot for the University of Akron Zips
Zippy (Rainbow), a character in Rainbow, a British pre-school children's television series
Zippy the Pinhead, the main character in a comic strip of the same name

Other uses
Zippy Race, a motorbike-driving arcade game
Zippy, brand name for the dialler made by New Zealand-based Compuspec
Zippy Water Heaters, a colloquial name for Zip Instant Boiling Water taps made by Zip Industries
Zippy, a former name of the data compression library Snappy

See also
Zip (disambiguation)
Zipp (disambiguation)